Frank Lacy (born August 9, 1958, Houston, Texas) is an American jazz trombonist who has spent many years as a member of the Mingus Big Band.

Career
Lacy's father was a teacher who played guitar with Arnett Cobb, Illinois Jacquet, and Eddie Cleanhead Vinson. His mother was a gospel singer. When Lacy was eight, he started learning piano. In his teens, he played trumpet, tuba, and euphonium before switching to trombone. He got a degree in physics from Texas Southern University. In 1979, he went to the Berklee College of Music in Boston, studying trombone and composition. His classmates included Branford Marsalis, Greg Osby, and Marvin Smith.

Lacy moved to New York City in 1981. In 1986, he played with Illinois Jacquet's big band, and a couple years later he was musical director for Art Blakey. He released his first album as a band leader in 1991 with his father on guitar. He has also worked with Lester Bowie, Marty Ehrlich, Michael Formanek, Slide Hampton, Roy Hargrove, Rufus Reid, Henry Threadgill, Steve Turre, McCoy Tyner, and Bobby Watson. He has spent over twenty years as a member of the Mingus Big Band.

Discography

As leader
 Tonal Weights and Blue Fire (Tutu, 1990)
 Settegast Strut (Tutu, 1995)
 Songs from the Musical Poker (Tutu, 1996)
 Heaven Sent, with Mauro Ottolini (Musica, 2013)
 That Which is Planted, with 10³²K (Passin' Thru, 2013)
 Live at Smalls (Smalls Live, 2014)

As sideman
With Mingus Big Band
 Nostalgia in Times Square (Dreyfus, 1993)
 Live in Time (Dreyfus, 1996)
 Que Viva Mingus (Dreyfus, 1997)
 Tonight at Noon (2002)
 I Am Three (2005)
 Live in Tokyo at the Blue Note (2006)
 Mingus Sings (Sunnyside, 2015)

With Lester Bowie
 Avant Pop (ECM, 1986)
 Twilight Dreams (1987)
 Serious Fun (DIW, 1989)
 My Way (DIW, 1990)
 The Fire This Time (1992)

With Roy Hargrove
 Approaching Standards (Novus, 1994)
 Habana (Verve, 1997)

With David Murray
 David Murray Big Band (DIW, 1991)
 South of the Border (DIW, 1992)

With Henry Threadgill
 You Know the Number (Novus, 1986) 
 Easily Slip Into Another World (Novus, 1987)

With Steve Turre
 Rhythm Within (Antilles, 1995)
 The Bones of Art (HighNote, 2013)

With McCoy Tyner
 Journey (Verve, 1993)
 The Turning Point (Verve, 1992)

With others
 Superblue, Superblue (Blue Note, 1988)
 Fleur Carnivore, Carla Bley (1988)
 Julius Hemphill Big Band, Julius Hemphill (1988)
 Chippin' In, Art Blakey (Timeless, 1990)
 Side by Side, Marty Ehrlich (1991)
 Tailor Made, Bobby Watson (1993)
 Shuttle, Ronnie Burrage (1993)
 Low Profile, Michael Formanek (1994)
 Art, Ralph Peterson Jr. (1994)
 The Voice of the Saxophone, Don Braden (1997)
 Social Call, Jazzmeia Horn (2017)
 Abstractions in Lime Caverns, Michael Marcus (ESP-Disk', 2022)

References

External links 

1959 births
Living people
American jazz trombonists
Male trombonists
The Jazz Messengers members
Musicians from Houston
21st-century trombonists
American male jazz musicians
Mingus Big Band members
Superblue (band) members
The Soultronics members